Too Mean to Die is the sixteenth studio album by German heavy metal band Accept, released on 29 January 2021. It is the first Accept album to feature Martin Motnik, who replaced original bassist Peter Baltes in 2019, and rhythm guitarist Philip Shouse, who joined the band that same year. As the band had signed to Napalm Records in February 2022, this is their last album to be released on Nuclear Blast.

Track listing

Personnel
 Mark Tornillo – vocals
 Wolf Hoffmann – lead guitar
 Uwe Lulis – rhythm guitar
 Philip Shouse – third guitar
 Martin Motnik – bass
 Christopher Williams – drums

Charts

References

2021 albums
Accept (band) albums